American actor Gary Cooper started his career in 1925 as a film extra and stuntman. He made his official cinematic debut in 1926 in the Samuel Goldwyn production The Winning of Barbara Worth. He went on to become a contract player with Paramount Pictures where he established himself as a popular leading man prior to the end of the silent film era.

Cooper's future in the sound era was assured with the release of The Virginian (1929), his first all-talkie film. For the next 32 years, he would be one of cinema's top money-making stars. From 1936 to 1957, Cooper ranked 18 times among the top ten box office attractions—a record when he died in 1961, and later surpassed only by John Wayne, who ranked among the top ten 25 times, Clint Eastwood (21 times) and Tom Cruise (20 times).

Cooper was nominated for the Best Actor Academy Award five times and won twice, for Sergeant York (1942) and High Noon (1952). The latter film boosted his popularity, resulting in him being the number one box office attraction in 1953. Cooper received a third Academy Award—an honorary one—just prior to his death. His final film, The Naked Edge, was released posthumously.

As of February 2008, more than half of Gary Cooper's feature films are available on DVD, while others not yet on home video are available for television broadcast. Unfortunately, at least two of his silent films—Beau Sabreur (1928) and The Legion of the Condemned (1928)—are now considered lost films. Another of his silent films, Wolf Song (1929), was originally released as a part talkie, but survives only as a silent film. One of Cooper's earliest talkies, Paramount on Parade (1930), survives incomplete. The prints that are available for television are missing all but one of the film's Technicolor scenes—a partial restoration of these scenes was done by the UCLA Film Archives.

The filmography contains sections for Cooper's work as an extra in the earliest part of his film career, his feature film appearances, his occasional appearances in short films, and a section for a compilation film. Due to its length (92 films), the listing of his feature films is divided in four sections. Cooper's film roles are listed, as well as the names of each film's director and co-stars. Cooper's awards and nominations are also listed. Except where noted, all of his films were shot in 35mm black and white. All films released prior to Lilac Time (1928) are silent films and all from The Virginian (1929) onward are sound films. The films made during the silent-to-sound transition are noted as being either silent or sound films. As an addendum, Cooper's handful of television appearances are also listed.

Filmography

Feature films as an extra, 1925–26 
 Feature films, 1926–30 

 Feature films, 1931–40 

 Feature films, 1941–50 

 Feature films, 1951–61 

 Short films 

 Compilation films

Television

Radio appearances

References

Notes

Citations

Bibliography

Further reading

External links 

 
 
 

Cooper, Gary
Cooper, Gary